Aimee Sun or Sun Yun-yun (born 14 May 1978) is a Taiwanese socialite, heiress, media personality, jewelry designer, businesswoman, celebrity endorser,
commercial actress and cover girl. She is a co-founder of Breeze Center, a shopping mall located in Taipei. Sun also served as the leading character of several TV commercials and earned several endorsement deals.

Her father is Sun Tao-tsun (孫道存), the former chairman of Pacific Electric Wire & Cable; and her mother is Ho Nien-Tsu (何念慈), the vice-chairwoman of Yuanta Securities.
Sun attended Dominican International School and Taipei American School for elementary school, and studied abroad at the University of Southern California. In June 1999, she married .

References

External links 

 

1978 births
Living people
Businesspeople from Taipei

Taiwanese women company founders